Katherine Hazel Strueby (28 May 1908 – 14 November 1988) was an American-born British screenwriter. She was married to the writer Gordon Wellesley.

Selected filmography
 Play Up the Band (1935)
 Death Drives Through (1935)
 It Happened in Paris (1935)
 Cafe Colette (1937)
 Special Edition (1938)
 The High Command (1938)
 Room for Two (1940)
 Candlelight in Algeria (1944)
 Flight from Folly (1945)
 Gaiety George (1946)
 Code of Scotland Yard (1947)
 Forbidden (1949)

References

Bibliography
 Brian McFarlane. Lance Comfort. Manchester University Press, 1999.

External links

1908 births
1988 deaths
American emigrants to England
People from Newton, Kansas
Screenwriters from Kansas
British women screenwriters
20th-century American screenwriters
20th-century British screenwriters